The Beaconsfield Supply Store is a one-story brick building in rural Ringgold County, Iowa, United States. Built in 1916, it became the birthplace of the Hy-Vee chain of stores when Charles Hyde and David Vredenburg opened a general store together in 1930. The building was later used for a variety of purposes, including a telephone exchange. It was added to the National Register of Historic Places in 2007.

The building serves as the community center for Beaconsfield, which, with 15 residents as of 2021, has been described as the smallest incorporated city in Iowa.

References

Hy-Vee
Commercial buildings completed in 1916
National Register of Historic Places in Ringgold County, Iowa
Commercial buildings on the National Register of Historic Places in Iowa
1916 establishments in Iowa